The  is a professional wrestling tag team championship owned by the Japanese promotion DDT Pro-Wrestling (DDT). The title was established in 2001. It is currently the only tag team championship in DDT. 

Like most professional wrestling championships, the title is won via the result of a scripted match. Although the title was established at a Consejo Mundial de Lucha Libre (CMLL) event and was defended in several other promotions, it never changed hands outside of DDT. , there have been a total of 76 reigns shared between 66 different teams consisting of 60 distinctive champions and 12 vacancies. The current champions are ShunMao (Mao and Shunma Katsumata) who are in their first reign.

History

The title was created in 2001 when Nosawa and Takashi Sasaki, while on tour in Mexico, allegedly defeated Starman and Vertigo on June 2, 2001, at a Consejo Mundial de Lucha Libre event.

On August 16, 2001, Mikami and Super Uchuu Power vacated the title and put it up for grab in the KO-D Tag League. They then defeated Sanshiro Takagi and Shoichi Ichimiya in the finals to win it back. However, a month later, the team split up and the title was vacated again.

The title was vacated a third time in May 2002 after Mikami suffered an injury. It was once again contested in that year KO-D Tag League and won by the Suicide Boyz (Mikami and Thanomsak Toba).

The 2003 and 2004 editions of the KO-D Tag League saw respectively Seiya Morohashi and Tomohiko Hashimoto, and Hero! and Kudo win the tournament and the title.

In 2004, Glenn "Q" Spectre became the first non-Japanese wrestler to win the title when he teamed with Danshoku Dino to defeat Ryuji Ito and Sanshiro Takagi.

In February 2020, the belts were replaced with a new design featuring the current DDT logo.

On May 22, 2022, Asuka became the first woman to win the title when she teamed with Mao to defeat Calamari Drunken Kings (Chris Brookes and Masahiro Takanashi). On November 22, it was announced that Harimau (Kazusada Higuchi and Naomi Yoshimura) would vacate the title because Yoshimura suffered an injury four days prior and would be out of action.

Reigns

Combined reigns 

By team

By wrestler

See also

Professional wrestling in Japan

References

External links
   KO-D Tag Team Championship

DDT Pro-Wrestling championships
Tag team wrestling championships